Silverberg (English adaptation of , meaning "a silver mountain" in German and Yiddish) is a surname. Notable persons with that name include:

Alice Silverberg, American mathematician
Brad Silverberg, American computer scientist and businessman
Christine E. Silverberg (born 1949), Canadian lawyer and police chief
Cory Silverberg, Canadian sex educator, author, public speaker and blogger
Daniel Silverberg, American assistant film and television director
Ira Silverberg, American literary agent
Jake Silverberg (born 1996), American cyclist
Jan-Erik Silfverberg (born 1953), former professional ice hockey player
Kristen Silverberg (born  1970), American diplomat
Paul Silverberg (1876-1959), German industrialist
Pinky Silverberg (1904–1964), American boxer
Robert Silverberg (born 1935), American science fiction writer
Stanley M. Silverberg (1919–1953), American lawyer

See also
 Silberberg (disambiguation)

Jewish surnames